Dardanus is a genus of hermit crabs belonging to the Diogenidae family.

List of species 
This genus contains the following species:

Dardanus arrosor (Herbst, 1796)
Dardanus aspersus (Berthold, 1846)
Dardanus australis Forest & Morgan, 1991
Dardanus brachyops Forest, 1963
Dardanus calidus (Risso, 1827)
Dardanus callichela Cook, 1989
Dardanus corrugatus Cook, 1989
Dardanus crassimanus (H. Milne-Edwards, 1836)
Dardanus dearmatus Henderson, 1888
Dardanus deformis H. Milne-Edwards, 1836
Dardanus fucosus Biffar & Provenzano, 1972
Dardanus gemmatus (H. Milne-Edwards, 1836)
Dardanus guttatus (Olivier, 1812)
Dardanus hessii (Miers, 1884)
Dardanus imbricatus (H. Milne-Edwards, 1848)
Dardanus imperator (Miers, 1881)
Dardanus impressus (De Haan, 1849)
Dardanus insignis (de Saussure, 1858)
Dardanus jacquesi Asakura & Hirayama, 2002
Dardanus janethaigae Ayon & Hendrickx, 2009
Dardanus jordani Schmitt, 1921
Dardanus lagopodes (Forskål, 1775)
Dardanus longior Asakura, 2006
Dardanus magdalenensis Ayon & Hendrickx, 2009
Dardanus megistos (Herbst, 1804)
Dardanus nudus Ayon & Hendrickx, 2009
Dardanus pectinatus (Ortmann, 1892)
Dardanus pedunculatus (Herbst, 1804)
Dardanus pilosus Ayon & Hendrickx, 2009
Dardanus robustus Asakura, 2006
Dardanus rufus Buitendijk, 1937
Dardanus sanguinocarpus Degener, 1925
Dardanus scutellatus (H. Milne-Edwards, 1848)
Dardanus setifer (H. Milne-Edwards, 1848)
Dardanus sinistripes (Stimpson, 1859)
Dardanus squarrosus Cook, 1989
Dardanus stimpsoni Ayon & Hendrickx, 2009
Dardanus sulcatus Edmondson, 1925
Dardanus tinctor (Forskal, 1775)
Dardanus umbella Asakura, 2006
Dardanus undulatus (Balss, 1921)
Dardanus venosus (H. Milne-Edwards, 1848)
Dardanus vulnerans (Thallwitz, 1892)
Dardanus woodmasoni (Alcock, 1905)

References

Diogenidae
Decapod genera